Cian Maciejewski (born 14 June 1988) is an Australian football (soccer) player who currently plays for Canberra United FC in the Australian W-League.

Personal life
Maciejewski has appeared in Australian Ninja Warrior on more than one occasion. She lives in Burrill Lake with her wife Tiarna.

References

1988 births
Living people
Australian Ninja Warrior contestants
Australian people of Polish descent
Australian women's soccer players
Women's association football midfielders
Canberra United FC players
LGBT association football players
Australian LGBT sportspeople
21st-century LGBT people
People from the South Coast (New South Wales)
Sportswomen from New South Wales
Soccer players from New South Wales